The Lisbon Open, also known by its sponsorship name Lights Cup, is a defunct men's tennis tournament. It was held for one year, in 1983, in Lisbon, Portugal and was played on outdoor clay courts. It was a Super Series category tournament and was part of the Grand Prix tennis circuit.

The tournament was organized by Hans Burkert, director of the Frankfurt Grand Prix tournament. He decided to move the Frankfurt Super Series tournament, held from 1980 until 1982, to Portugal because of the competition of other major events in West Germany and with the aim to develop professional tennis in Portugal.

Finals

Singles

Doubles

See also
Portuguese International Championships

References

External links
Lisbon Open

 
ATP Tour
Sport in Lisbon
Grand Prix tennis circuit
Defunct tennis tournaments in Europe
Defunct sports competitions in Portugal